Paws Incorporated, legally known as Paws, Inc., is an American comic studio and production company founded by American cartoonist Jim Davis in 1981 to support the Garfield comic strips and its licensing. The company was originally located in Davis' home state of Indiana. Its building was established in Muncie in 1989, relocated from Davis' own farm when he was a boy.

In 1994, the company purchased all rights to the classic Garfield comic strips from 1978 to 1993 from United Feature Syndicate, although United still holds the original black-and-white daily strips and original color Sunday strips. The full-color daily strips and recolored Sunday strips are copyrighted to Paws as they are considered a different product. The strip is currently distributed by Andrews McMeel Syndication (formerly Universal Press Syndicate and Universal Uclick), while rights for the strip remain with Paws, Inc. By 2015, the company employed almost fifty artists and administrators.

In 2019, Davis sold Paws, Inc. to Viacom (now known as Paramount Global), including global merchandising and existing licensees. The deal put Paws under Viacom's Nickelodeon banner (which itself is part of its Kids & Family division). The deal excluded the rights to the live action Garfield films from 2004 to 2006, which are now owned by The Walt Disney Company through its 20th Century Studios label, as well as the upcoming animated Garfield film, which will be distributed by Sony Pictures. Although Paws, Inc. is now effectively located in Manhattan, Davis will continue to draw the comic strips in Indiana for newspapers and Andrews McMeel Syndication.

Filmography

Television specials

Television series

Feature films

References 

1981 establishments in Indiana
Publishing companies established in 1981
Comic book publishing companies of the United States
Garfield
Publishing companies based in New York City
American companies established in 1981
Jim Davis (cartoonist)
Paramount Global subsidiaries
2019 mergers and acquisitions
Nickelodeon